John Patrick Dalton (April 1, 1889 – March 10, 1919) was an American college football player and captain for the Navy Midshipmen football team of the United States Naval Academy.  He was recognized as a consensus first-team All-American in 1911, and elected to the College Football Hall of Fame in 1970. In 1919, he died due to a "bronchial ailment".

References

External links
 

1889 births
1919 deaths
American football halfbacks
Navy Midshipmen football players
All-American college football players
College Football Hall of Fame inductees
Players of American football from St. Louis